Thunstetten Castle is a castle in the municipality of Thunstetten of the Canton of Bern in Switzerland.  It is a Swiss heritage site of national significance.

See also
 List of castles in Switzerland

References

Cultural property of national significance in the canton of Bern
Castles in the Canton of Bern